Eastriggs railway station was a railway station in Dumfries and Galloway between Annan and Gretna.

Dumfries and Galloway Council are trying to find funding to reopen the station.

History 

The station opened 23 August 1848 as Dornock. Six years later it was closed for a period of 11 years, from October 1854 until 2 January 1865. It was renamed as Eastriggs by the London Midland and Scottish Railway on 1 May 1923.

The station closed on 6 December 1965, although the line through the station is still open.

Station buildings still exist, currently as private houses.

References

Notes

Sources

External links
 RAILSCOT on Glasgow, Dumfries and Carlisle Railway 

Disused railway stations in Dumfries and Galloway
Former Glasgow and South Western Railway stations
Railway stations in Great Britain opened in 1848
Railway stations in Great Britain closed in 1854
Railway stations in Great Britain opened in 1865
Railway stations in Great Britain closed in 1965
Beeching closures in Scotland